Dupontia  may refer to:
 Dupontia (plant), a grass genus in the family Poaceae
 Dupontia (gastropod), a land snail genus in the family Helixarionidae